Chidi Godson Njokuani (born December 31, 1988) is an American former Muay Thai kickboxer and current professional mixed martial artist who currently competes in the Middleweight division of the Ultimate Fighting Championship (UFC). A professional MMA competitor since 2007, he also formerly competed for Bellator MMA, RFA, Tachi Palace Fights, and Legacy FC.

Background 
Chidi Njokuani was born to Nigerian parents in Dallas, Texas on December 31, 1988. His name "Chidi" means "God exists" in Igbo. He was introduced to Muay Thai by his older brother Anthony at the age of 10 and began competing at the age of 11. He was temporarily distracted from Muay Thai with skateboarding during his teenage years but eventually returned to fighting and discovered mixed martial arts at the age of 18.

Career

Kickboxing & Muay Thai 
Turning professional in 2007 after around fifteen amateur Muay Thai fights, Chidi Njokuani came to prominence competing in the -80.7 kg/178 lb division for the Oklahoma Destroyers in the team-based World Combat League kickboxing promotion during the 2007-08 season in which he lost matches to such notables as Raymond Daniels and Lyman Good. He suffered his first professional Muay Thai loss at the hands of Joe Schilling on April 25, 2009 (dropping a unanimous decision at Dominant Knockout 1 in Irving, Texas) but rebounded with back-to-back defeats of Edwin Aguilar (a UD win under Oriental kickboxing rules at Kickboxing Empire I in Las Vegas, Nevada on July 30, 2011) and Ken Tran (a second round knockout at Lion Fight: Battle in the Desert 4 in Las Vegas on November 19, 2011).

Returning to the Muay Thai ring, Njokuani fought to a controversial majority draw with Simon Marcus on the Push Kick Promotions: Muay Thai World Stand Off 5 card in Las Vegas on September 29, 2013. Njokuani started the fight well, using footwork to control the ring, but Marcus soon got inside and began landing knees and elbows from the clinch. In round two, Njokuani was twice given time to recover from illegal strikes, an elbow to the back of the head and a low blow. Each time the fight continued, Marcus would begin to again work in the clinch and Njokuani repeatedly turned his back, so the referee decided to break the fighters continually. Marcus was docked a point by referee Tony Weeks for landing a second low blow in round three and the fight turned into a brawl towards the end. When it went to the judges, the bout was declared a majority draw with two judges scoring the bout a draw and one scoring the bout for Njokuani. Simon Marcus then took to the microphone, calling Chidi Njokuani a "bitch" for his unwillingness to fight in the clinch and questioning the judges knowledge of the Muay Thai scoring system. These post-fight comments led to a heated confrontation between Marcus and Chidi's brother Anthony as they scuffled back stage.

Mixed martial arts

Resurrection Fighting Alliance 
Having compiled a 7–3 record as a mixed martial artist, Njokuani signed with the Resurrection Fighting Alliance in 2012. He made his RFA debut at RFA 3: Stevenson vs. Cochrane, against Bobby Cooper. He won via the first decision of his career.

Njokuani then was paired up with Phil Dace at RFA 4. He won via TKO.

Njokuani fought Jeremy Kimball at RFA 7 and lost via submission.

Bellator MMA 
In June 2015, it was announced that Njokuani had signed with Bellator MMA. He made his debut against Ricky Rainey at Bellator 146 on November 20, 2015. He won the fight by unanimous decision.

In his second fight for the promotion, Njokuani was scheduled to face Douglas Lima, however Lima pulled out of the bout and was replaced b  Thiago Jambo at Bellator 156 on June 17, 2016. He won that fight via knockout due to a combination of body kick and punches.

In his highest profile fight for the promotion, Njokuani faced undefeated prospect André Fialho at Bellator 167 on December 3, 2016. He won the fight via knockout just 21 seconds into the first round.

Making a quick return to the cage, Njokuani faced Melvin Guillard in the main event at Bellator 171 on January 27, 2017. He won the fight by unanimous decision.

Njokuani faced former Bellator welterweight champion Andrey Koreshkov at Bellator 182 on August 25, 2017. He lost the fight in the first round via a combination of punches and elbows.

Njokuani next moved up to Middleweight to face Hisaki Kato at Bellator 189 on December 1, 2017. He won the fight by unanimous decision.

Njokuani was scheduled to face Melvin Manhoef on November 30, 2018 at Bellator 210. However, Manhoef withdrew from the bout due to injury and was replaced by John Salter. Njokuani lost the bout via submission in the first round.

Njokuani faced Rafael Carvalho at Bellator 224 in a 190 pound Catchweight bout on July 12, 2019. He lost the fight by unanimous decision. Njokuani was subsequently released from the promotion.

Post-Bellator
After being released from Bellator, Njokuani signed a contract with Legacy Fighting Alliance. He made his promotional debut against Cristhian Torres at LFA 91: Njokuani vs. Torres on September 11, 2020, winning by second-round technical knockout.

Njokuani faced Mario Sousa on September 7, 2021 at Dana White's Contender Series 38. He won the bout in the third round via ground and pound elbows. In the process, he also secured a UFC contract.

Ultimate Fighting Championship
In his UFC debut, Njokuani faced Marc-André Barriault on February 5, 2022 at UFC Fight Night: Hermansson vs. Strickland. He won the fight via knockout in round one. This fight earned him the Performance of the Night award.

Njokuani next faced Duško Todorović on May 21, 2022 at UFC Fight Night 206. He won the fight via knockout due to an elbow at the end of the first round. This win earned him a second consecutive Performance of the Night award.

Njokuani faced Gregory Rodrigues on September 17, 2022 at UFC Fight Night 210. He lost the fight via technical knockout in round two. This fight earned him the Fight of the Night award.

Njokuani is scheduled to face Albert Duraev on March 25, 2023 at UFC on ESPN 43.

Championships and accomplishments
Ultimate Fighting Championship
Performance of the Night (Two times) 
Fight of the Night (One time) 
Tachi Palace Fights
Tachi PF Welterweight Championship (One time)

Mixed martial arts record

|-
|Loss
|align=center|22–8 (1)
|Gregory Rodrigues
|TKO (punches)
|UFC Fight Night: Sandhagen vs. Song 
|
|align=center|2
|align=center|1:27
|Las Vegas, Nevada, United States
|
|-
|Win
|align=center|22–7 (1)
|Duško Todorović
|KO (elbow)
|UFC Fight Night: Holm vs. Vieira
|
|align=center|1
|align=center|4:48
|Las Vegas, Nevada, United States
|
|-
|Win
|align=center|21–7 (1)
|Marc-André Barriault
|KO (punches)
|UFC Fight Night: Hermansson vs. Strickland
| 
|align=center|1
|align=center|0:16
|Las Vegas, Nevada, United States
|
|-
|Win
|align=center|20–7 (1)
|Mário Sousa
|TKO (elbows)
|Dana White's Contender Series 38
|
|align=center|3
|align=center|1:35
|Las Vegas, Nevada, United States
|
|-
|Win
|align=center|19–7 (1)
|Cristhian Torres
|TKO (knee to the body and punches)
|LFA 91
|
|align=center|2
|align=center|4:10
|Sioux Falls, South Dakota, United States
|
|-
|Loss
|align=center|18–7 (1)
|Rafael Carvalho
|Decision (unanimous)
|Bellator 224
|
|align=center|3
|align=center|5:00
|Thackerville, Oklahoma, United States
|
|-
|Loss
|align=center|18–6 (1)
|John Salter
|Submission (rear-naked choke)
|Bellator 210
|
|align=center|1
|align=center|4:32
|Thackerville, Oklahoma, United States
|
|-
|Win
|align=center|18–5 (1)
|Hisaki Kato
|Decision (unanimous)
|Bellator 189
|
|align=center|3
|align=center|5:00
|Thackerville, Oklahoma, United States
|
|-
|Loss
|align=center|17–5 (1)
|Andrey Koreshkov
|TKO (punches and elbows)
|Bellator 182
|
|align=center|1
|align=center|4:08
|Verona, New York, United States
|
|-
|Win
|align=center|17–4 (1)
|Melvin Guillard
|Decision (unanimous)
|Bellator 171
|
|align=center|3
|align=center|5:00
|Mulvane, Kansas, United States
|
|-
|Win
|align=center|16–4 (1)
|André Fialho
|TKO (punches)
|Bellator 167
|
|align=center|1
|align=center|0:21
|Thackerville, Oklahoma, United States
|
|-
|Win
|align=center|15–4 (1)
|Thiago Gonçalves
|KO (body kick and punches)
|Bellator 156
|
|align=center|3
|align=center|2:39
|Fresno, California, United States
|
|-
|Win
|align=center|14–4 (1)
|Ricky Rainey
|Decision (unanimous)
|Bellator 146
|
|align=center|3
|align=center|5:00
|Thackerville, Oklahoma, United States
|
|-
|Win
|align=center|13–4 (1)
|Max Griffin
|Decision (split)
|TPF 23
|
|align=center|5
|align=center|5:00
|Lemoore, California, United States
|
|-
|Win
|align=center|12–4 (1)
|Gilbert Smith
|Decision (unanimous)
|RFA 22
|
|align=center|5
|align=center|5:00
|Colorado Springs, Colorado, United States
|
|-
|Win
|align=center|11–4 (1)
|Steve Hanna
|Decision (unanimous)
|RFA 18
|
|align=center|3
|align=center|5:00
|Albuquerque, New Mexico, United States
|
|-
|NC
|align=center|10–4 (1)
|Chris Heatherly
|NC (elbow to spine)
|RFA 13
|
|align=center|1
|align=center|3:31
|Lincoln, Nebraska, United States
|
|-
|Win
|align=center|10–4
|LeVon Maynard
|TKO (punches)
|ShinZo Fight Sport 1
|
|align=center|1
|align=center|4:40
|Guatemala City, Guatemala
|
|-
|Loss
|align=center|9–4
|Jeremy Kimball
|Submission (rear-naked choke)
|RFA 7
|
|align=center|2
|align=center|1:51
|Denver, Colorado, United States
|
|-
|Win
|align=center|9–3
|Phil Dace
|TKO (punches)
|RFA 4
|
|align=center|3
|align=center|0:41
|Las Vegas, Nevada, United States
|
|-
|Win
|align=center|8–3
|Bobby Cooper
|Decision (unanimous)
|RFA 3
|
|align=center|3
|align=center|5:00
|Kearney, Nebraska, United States
|
|-
|Win
|align=center|7–3
|John Reedy
|TKO (leg kick)
|TPF 13
|
|align=center|1
|align=center|0:55
|Lemoore, California, United States
|
|-
|Win
|align=center|6–3
|Jon Harris
|TKO (knee and punches)
|Legacy FC 10
|
|align=center|1
|align=center|1:54
|Houston, Texas, United States
|
|-
|Loss
|align=center|5–3
|Brandon Thatch
|TKO (punches)
|Ring of Fire 41: Bragging Rights
|	
|align=center|1
|align=center|0:53
|Broomfield, Colorado, United States
|
|-
|Win
|align=center|5–2
|Alan Jouban
|TKO (body kick)
|TPF 9
|
|align=center|3
|align=center|1:27
|Lemoore, California, United States
|
|-
|Win
|align=center|4–2
|Jack Montgomery
|Submission (guillotine choke)
|KOTC: Infusion
|
|align=center|1
|align=center|1:35
|Las Vegas, Nevada, United States
|
|-
|Win
|align=center|3–2
|Chris Kennedy
|KO (punches)
|MMA Xplosion: Vianna vs. Lacy
|
|align=center|1
|align=center|0:52
|Las Vegas, Nevada, United States
|
|-
|Loss
|align=center|2–2
|Jorge Lopez
|TKO (punches)
|MMA Xplosion: Next Generation Fighter
|
|align=center|1
|align=center|4:15
|Las Vegas, Nevada, United States
|
|-
|Loss
|align=center|2–1
|Warren Thompson
|Submission (keylock)
|Bangkok Fight Night 3
|
|align=center|1
|align=center|1:05
|Atlanta, Georgia, United States
|
|-
|Win
|align=center|2–0
|Andrew Moncriefe
|TKO (punches)
|Supreme Warrior Championship 1
|
|align=center|1
|align=center|0:22
|Frisco, Texas, United States
|
|-
|Win
|align=center|1–0
|Jorge Cortez
|TKO (punches)
|FTP: Global Showdown
|
|align=center|1
|align=center|1:30
|Thackerville, Oklahoma, United States
|

Kickboxing record

|-  bgcolor="#c5d2ea"
|2013-9-28 || Draw ||align=left| Simon Marcus || Push Kick Promotions: Muay Thai World Stand Off 5 || Las Vegas, Nevada, US || Decision (majority)  || 3 || 3:00 || 0-2-1
|-  bgcolor="#FFBBBB"
| 2009-4-25 || Loss ||align=left| Joe Schilling || Dominant Knockout 1 || Irving, Texas, US|| Decision (unanimous)  || 5 || 3:00 || 0-2 
|-  bgcolor="#FFBBBB"
| 2008-5-3 || Loss ||align=left| Raymond Daniels || World Combat League || Oklahoma, USA || Decision (18-6)  || 1 || 3:00 || 0-1

See also 
 List of current UFC fighters
 List of male mixed martial artists

References

External links 
  
 

1988 births
Living people
American male mixed martial artists
Welterweight mixed martial artists
Middleweight mixed martial artists
Mixed martial artists utilizing Muay Thai
Mixed martial artists utilizing Brazilian jiu-jitsu
Ultimate Fighting Championship male fighters
Bellator male fighters
American male kickboxers
Light heavyweight kickboxers
Kickboxers from Texas
American Muay Thai practitioners
American practitioners of Brazilian jiu-jitsu
People awarded a black belt in Brazilian jiu-jitsu
American sportspeople of Nigerian descent
Igbo sportspeople
Sportspeople from Dallas